Paromphale is a genus of moths of the family Noctuidae.

Species
 Paromphale caeca (Swinhoe, 1902)

References
Natural History Museum Lepidoptera genus database
Paromphale at funet

Hadeninae